Christopher Langham (born 14 April 1949) is an English writer, actor, and comedian. He is known for playing the cabinet minister Hugh Abbot in the BBC sitcom The Thick of It, and as presenter Roy Mallard in People Like Us, first on BBC Radio 4 and later on its transfer to television on BBC Two, where Mallard is almost entirely an unseen character. He subsequently created several spoof advertisements in the same vein. He also played similar unseen interviewers in an episode of the television series Happy Families and in the film The Big Tease. He is also known for his roles in the television series Not the Nine O'Clock News, Help, and Kiss Me Kate, and as the gatehouse guard in Chelmsford 123. In 2006, he won BAFTA awards for The Thick of It and Help.

On 2 August 2007, Langham was found guilty of 15 charges of downloading and possessing level 5 child sexual abuse images and videos. Langham was jailed for 10 months, reduced to 6 months on appeal. He was made to sign the sex offenders' register and was banned from working with children for 10 years.

Early life and education
Langham is the son of theatre director Michael Langham and actress Helen Burns. He was educated at St Paul's School, an independent school for boys in Barnes in West London, followed by the University of Bristol, where he studied English and drama, before dropping out.

Career 
Langham began performing comedy and writing for Spike Milligan.

One of his earliest breaks was as the sole British writer for The Muppet Show. He also appeared as the "special guest star" in the 19th episode of the final season, when the scheduled guest, Richard Pryor, was unable to make it to the recording; a script was hastily written in which "Chris the Delivery Boy" stood in for an absent celebrity. He received two awards from the Writers Guild of America for his work on The Muppet Show. He also made a brief appearance as a police driver in The Pink Panther Strikes Again in 1976, opposite Peter Sellers. In 1976 also was the inception, at the Science Fiction Theatre of Liverpool, of the nine-hour stage play Illuminatus, which Langham co-wrote with Ken Campbell. In 1977, the production transferred to the Cottesloe Theatre, London, where he took the part of George Dorn, giving a performance which Peter Hall found "extremely impressive".

Langham was part of the original cast for the pilot for Not the Nine O'Clock News in 1979, written by Richard Curtis. The show was positioned as a comedy series, which was neither Monty Python's Flying Circus nor The Two Ronnies. Even after the original pilot was pulled from the schedules, Langham was retained for the first full series, billed equally with the then-unknown Mel Smith, Pamela Stephenson, and Rowan Atkinson. The first series did not rate as well as hoped, however, and  Langham was felt to be  "too independent a spirit." Langham took a part in Monty Python's Life of Brian as a centurion, a film which generated controversy for its satire of Christianity, resulting in a televised debate between John Cleese, Michael Palin, Malcolm Muggeridge, and Mervyn Stockwood over whether the film is blasphemous. Curtis had written a skit that parodied this debate itself. Langham was upset at the inclusion of the sketch, which gave the team and producer John Lloyd the excuse for his replacement by support player Griff Rhys Jones. Langham did not learn of the switch until the last day of filming, when he heard the crew discussing the second series. The show only achieved cult status during its later series, and in subsequent compilation repeats, most of Langham's contributions have been cut, giving the impression that he was never a main cast member.

Langham went on to appear on Smith and Jones' own programme, Alas Smith and Jones, playing an ineffectual panel-show host. This character apparently inspired John Morton to create the character of Roy Mallard, who was later to feature in his show People Like Us; Mallard was played both on radio and (offscreen) on television by Langham. Langham also played a fly-on-the-wall documentary interviewer very similar to Roy Mallard in Happy Families in 1985.

Also in 1979, Langham played Arthur Dent in the first professional stage version of The Hitchhiker's Guide to the Galaxy, directed by Ken Campbell. He later returned to Hitchhiker's, appearing as Prak in Above The Title Productions' Tertiary Phase radio series in 2004.

He appeared in a series of Birdseye advertisements for their Steakhouse range (1991–1993).

Langham narrated the 1984 radio series The History of Rock with Chris Langham, in which Langham gave a comedic and somewhat fictitious account of the history of rock music. On 14 November 1985, Langham appeared as the narrator/reporter in "Roxanne", episode five of the BBC situation comedy Happy Families, written by Ben Elton. In 1992, he appeared in the film Carry On Columbus.

In addition to several one-man shows, Langham counts among his stage credits Les Misérables, in which he played Thénardier in 1996; Crazy for You, for which he received an Olivier nomination; The Way of the World, The Nerd and The Pirates of Penzance. He created the comic role of the Assassin in Blondel (co-starring Paul Nicholas; by Tim Rice and Stephen Oliver), and appears on the original cast album.

Langham wrote the BBC One sitcom Kiss Me Kate, in which he appeared alongside Caroline Quentin and Amanda Holden. In 2002, he wrote and starred in Bradford in My Dreams, an adaptation of a short story by Lawrence Block for the BBC. On Radio 4, he narrated the series The Rapid Eye Movement, which starred Martin Freeman as Chester Beatty, in whose head the entire series took place. In 2003, he directed the BBC TV comedy series Posh Nosh.

In 2003 and 2005, respectively, he portrayed authors George Orwell and John Wyndham in the BBC docudrama George Orwell – A Life in Pictures and the BBC Four documentary John Wyndham: the Invisible Man of Science Fiction. He also appeared in the radio magazine satire The Sunday Format.

He starred alongside co-writer Paul Whitehouse in Help on BBC Two in 2005, where he also appeared in the Armando Iannucci comedy The Thick of It in the same year. Langham was named Best Comedy Actor in the 2005 British Comedy Awards and won the 2006 BAFTA Best Comedy Performance award for his role in The Thick of It. In November 2005, Langham wrote and starred in ITV pilot Seven Second Delay.

He was a frequent guest on The Heaven and Earth Show. He was part of the writing team for  Bremner, Bird and Fortune, in which he occasionally appeared as a civil servant discussing things with Bremner's Tony Blair. Langham has appeared as a panelist on the Radio 4 show Armando Iannucci's Charm Offensive.

A few days after his release from prison in 2008, Langham was interviewed by celebrity psychologist Pamela Connolly, with whom he had worked on Not the Nine O'Clock News, for her UK television series Shrink Rap, where he discussed being abused as an eight-year-old child, events which he said led to his trial and conviction. The interview was broadcast on More4 on 15 January 2008. Langham was also invited to make a speech in front of the Oxford Union on 29 May 2008, but the invitation was then withdrawn.

In 2011, in his first screen appearance after his release, he was cast as the lead in Black Pond, a low-budget British film directed by Tom Kingsley and Will Sharpe. In an interview with The Guardian in September 2011, Langham stated that many people had suggested to him that he should work again, but no one wanted to employ him. Reviewing his performance in Black Pond positively, The Independent commented, "whether it will rehabilitate him among casting agents and comedy show commissioners is another question". The Kino Digital cinema in Hawkhurst had a screening of the film on 11 December 2011. Afterwards, Langham, who lived nearby, held a brief question-and-answer session to help promote the film.

In 2012, he appeared with Billy Murray, Leslie Grantham, and Crissy Rock in Richard John Taylor's drama film Acceptance.

In 2021, Langham's The Muppet Show episode was not made available on Disney+ when the series was added to the streaming service. Disney stated that most missing episodes and segments were due to music-rights issues, but refused to comment on Langham in particular.

Personal life 
Langham's first marriage, to actress/singer Sue Jones-Davies, produced three children, but broke up on his own admission due to his alcoholism. Langham had two children by his second wife, director Christine Cartwright.

Langham sought counselling for alcohol and cocaine addiction, and was still undergoing therapy once a week as of 2006. He used his experiences to co-write the BBC2 series Help, in which he portrayed a psychotherapist, with friend Paul Whitehouse, and played a counsellor in sitcom Kiss Me Kate.

Despite his conviction and imprisonment for possession of images of child abuse, his marriage to Cartwright survived, and his wife and children continued to live with him in the family home in Cranbrook, Kent, after his release. Likewise, his three sons from his first marriage stood by him.

Arrest and conviction 
On 29 November 2005, Langham was arrested by Kent Police in connection with Operation Ore, a British police operation into credit-card customers paying to access indecent and abusive images of children on the internet. The arrest was first reported in the press on 16 December 2005, in response to which Langham's lawyer read a statement in which he said that he was innocent and pointed out that he had not been charged. On 11 May 2006, he was charged with 15 counts of "making indecent images" (a legal term meaning to download and store indecent images as distinct from the act of photography) of children.

The trial took place at Maidstone Crown Court during July and August 2007. Part of Langham's defence to these charges in court was that they were research on a peeping tom character "Pedro" for a television comedy. Langham's former Help co-star/writer Paul Whitehouse confirmed that the character was referred to as a "peeping tom" who was prone to highly dubious sexual behaviour. Whitehouse stated that the character was not intended to be a paedophile, nor was he personally aware of Langham obtaining such material for the development of the programme's script. The prosecutor, Richard Barraclough QC, asked Whitehouse, "Did Mr Langham ever discuss with you that he was undertaking any research for the shows?" "Not to my knowledge, no," Whitehouse replied. Langham also said in court that he was the victim of child sexual abuse and this caused him to look for images; Barraclough called this "pseudo-psychobabble" and the judge dismissed its legality as a defence.
Langham had paid with his credit card for access to a site entitled "European Lolita Sex" in 1999. On the evening that the public was made aware of the scope of Operation Ore, Langham had contacted police to report his "concern" about spam emails, with links to paedophile sites, which he said he was receiving. The prosecution said that he had contacted police because he had "panicked" and "wanted to give the impression of being a good citizen".

During his trial, he was also accused of having sex with an under-age girl in upmarket hotels, his West End dressing room, his car, and his home. The accuser claimed this had started when she was 14 years old. Langham denied the charges and claimed he had only had sex with her when she was 18. He was found not guilty of six counts of indecent assault and two counts of buggery between January 1996 and April 2000.

On 2 August 2007, Langham was found guilty on charges of possessing child sexual abuse images and videos. He was sentenced to 10 months in prison and was placed on the sexual offenders register for 10 years. Before sentencing, the judge said that "some of the children viewed are clearly prepubescent... The worst video was 15 minutes long and it showed in quite graphic detail the sadistic brutalisation of an eight-year-old girl in the UK, with some serious sexual offences against her".

He was released on 14 November 2007, after his sentence was reduced to six months on appeal. Dame Heather Steel, who gave the decision, said that the court viewed Langham's explanation that he viewed the child sexual abuse images for research as "highly improbable", but could not reject it, although he was still guilty of encouraging "despicable acts" through downloading the images of child sexual abuse. On his release, Langham stated, "My life has been ruined, but my conscience is clear" and complained that the media "completely ignored" the court's "acceptance based upon all the evidence and expert opinion that I have no sexual interest in children". Despite the judge ruling, "Paedophilia is not an issue in this case" and "[Langham] is not a sexual predator", after the trial Detective Superintendent Paul Fotheringham of Kent Police told journalists, "Langham doesn’t like the label, but I am satisfied that he is a paedophile".

References

External links 

Chris Langham at the British Film Institute
 at the bbc.co.uk Guide to Comedy

Interviews
"My top TV: Chris Langham" at BBC News Online (May 2001)
"'Just to be OK is something I crave'" at The Guardian (May 2006)

1949 births
20th-century English male actors
21st-century English criminals
21st-century English male actors
Alumni of the University of Bristol
British male television writers
Best Comedy Performance BAFTA Award (television) winners
BBC people
British male criminals
Criminals from London
Emmy Award winners
English comedy writers
English male comedians
English male television actors
English male voice actors
English people convicted of child pornography offences
English television writers
Living people
People educated at St Paul's School, London
Prisoners and detainees of England and Wales
Writers Guild of America Award winners